Lt. Franklin Barney Bellows (July 9, 1896–September 13, 1918) was an American soldier of World War I. Bellows Air Force Station in the U.S. state of Hawaii is named in his honor. 

A son of John Austin and Cora Barney Bellows, he grew up in Evanston and Kenilworth, Illinois. Bellows graduated from New Trier High School and Northwestern University, and "enlisted in the first officer's training camp at Fort Sheridan. In November 1917, he was assigned to the 50th Aero Squadron." While flying "early in the morning of the second day of the St. Mihiel offensive in spite of low clouds, high winds, and mist, flying at an altitude of only 300 meters, and without protection of accompanying battle planes" Bellows' plane was hit with machine gun fire and he "died in the line of duty after securing crucial information on a reconnaissance mission in France." Bellows was the observer; the pilot David C. Beebe survived the mission and returned the plane back behind allied lines. 

According to a government statement released at the time of the renaming:

Bellows was awarded the Distinguished Service Cross and the Croix de Guerre. He is buried in the American Military Cemetery in Saint-Mihiel, France. On August 19, 1933, the airfield at Waimanalo Military Reservation, Territory of Hawaii was named in his honor.

References

External links
 Brief Historical Timeline of Bellows
 Chicago and the Great War, Chicago History Museum

1896 births
1918 deaths
United States Army soldiers
American military personnel killed in World War I
Northwestern University alumni